The Inter-Community School Zürich (ICS or ICSZ) is a private, independent, international, co-educational day school and offers a comprehensive educational programme in English for children from ages of 3 to 18. The school is international in character and welcomes students of all nationalities. Since 1971, the Inter-Community School has been located in Zumikon near Zurich, Switzerland. It has been an International Baccalaureate World School since 1993.

ICS's Kindergarten and Primary education programmes (Primary School) are approved by the bureau for elementary school (Volksschulamt), administration for education (Bildungsdirektion), canton of Zurich.

Also ICS's lower Secondary education programme (Secondary School, Grades 6 to 8, and Grade 9) is approved as Sekundarstufe by the bureau for elementary school (Volksschulamt), administration for education (Bildungsdirektion), canton of Zurich.

However ICS's upper Secondary education programme (Secondary School, Grades 10 to 12) is neither approved as a Mittelschule by the bureau for secondary and vocational education (Mittelschul- und Berufsbildungsamt), administration of education (Bildungsdirektion), canton of Zurich, and nor approved by the Swiss Federal State Secretariat for Education, Research and Innovation SERI.

History

1960-1969
The Inter-Community School Zurich was founded on March 18, 1960, at a meeting at the Hotel Carlton Elite between the American, Australian, British and Canadian communities of Zurich. The school enrolled 84 students aged 4–13 during its first semester at the Hotel Rigiblick. There were five staff members employed at the time as well as the founder Gerald Atkinson and his wife.

In May 1961, ICS signed a lease with the city of Zurich for the rental of a lakeside villa (which in the 1930s had been renovated for use by Prince Paul of Yugoslavia) In September of that year, ICS began its second year of operation in the new villa with 160 students enrolled.

By 1967, there were 200 students enrolled from kindergarten to seventh grade with two classes per grade. Rooms were in short supply, therefore facility was found in Regensdorf. Shortly thereafter, the upper primary classes were moved to Regensdorf, while the lower primary classes remained in the lakeside villa on Seefeldquai. The search for one facility to house the entire school was now underway.

The founder of ICS Gerald Atkinson relinquished his ownership of the school in 1968, to facilitate the process of ICS gaining the legal non-profit foundation status. This non-profit foundation status would make it easier to raise funds for the purchasing of a new building. On August 1, 1968, the Foundation of The Inter-Community School was established under the Swiss Civil Code.

1970-1986
In early 1970 the municipality of Dübendorf, a suburb near Zurich, had just completed the construction of a new primary school, but only required half of the rooms. ICS was offered the use of the other half of the building for one year, while another more permanent location was sought. In April 1970, the lower primary classes moved out of the lakeside villa in Zurich to the new temporary facility in Dübendorf. The upper primary classes remained in Regensdorf during this period.

At the same time, the board of trustees had found a farmer in Zumikon who was willing to sell ICS some of his land. The contract for the purchase was signed in November 1970. After receiving two major loans from Credit Suisse and the Union Bank of Switzerland, ICS was ready to build its own facility. Construction began in November 1971 and was completed in December 1972. When the winter term began in 1973, the entire school was under one roof - this was the Primary School building. 270 students were now enrolled at ICS. In 1977 additional land was purchased, and extensions to the Primary School building were done in 1979 and 1982. Shortly thereafter in 1985, a library and kindergarten were built.

The 1974 'Brink Report' by the Board of Trustees formulated plans for the development of a secondary school at ICS. The first pavilion was erected in 1987 as the first secondary school classroom.

Academics
The medium of instruction is English, but all children above Kindergarten must study German. From grade 6, students are also required to study a third language (French or Spanish). 
The academic curriculum of the school is based upon the programmes of the International Baccalaureate, and ICS is the only Zurich area school authorized to offer the IB programmes at all levels. The IB programmes are designed to facilitate transition to and from national education systems and entry into universities around the world.

Class maximum size varies between 16 and 24 depending upon grade level and there is a student-teacher ratio of approximately 8:1.

Just under half of the student body is composed of native speakers of English, and the school has a programme of English as an additional language (EAL) and learning support.

References

External links
 Official homepage
 Online Curriculum Centre

Educational institutions established in 1960
Schools in Zürich
International schools in Switzerland
International Baccalaureate schools in Switzerland
Private schools in Switzerland
1960 establishments in Switzerland